Arturo del Puerto is an American actor known for his roles on Fear the Walking Dead, Chicago P.D., Ride Along 2, and the Apple TV+ original science fiction space drama series For All Mankind.

Biography
Del Puerto is half Puerto Rican and half Spanish. He studied acting and singing in Madrid and improvisation at the UCB Centre in New York.

Filmography

Film

Television

References

External links
 
 Twitter

Living people
American male television actors
Place of birth missing (living people)
American male film actors
1976 births